Šimon Gabriel (born 28 May 2001) is a Czech footballer who currently plays as a defender for FK Viktoria Žižkov, on loan from Viktoria Plzeň.

Personal life
Gabriel and his twin, Adam, are sons of former Czech Republic international Petr Gabriel.

Career statistics

Club

References

External links
International statistics

2001 births
Living people
Czech footballers
Czech Republic youth international footballers
Association football defenders
AC Sparta Prague players
FC Viktoria Plzeň players
FK Mladá Boleslav players
FK Teplice players
FK Viktoria Žižkov players
Czech First League players